Papillion is a city in Nebraska, U.S.

Papillion may also refer to:
 Papillion-La Vista Public Schools
 Papillion-La Vista Senior High School
 Papillion Junior High
 Papillion Creek, Nebraska, U.S.

See also
Papillon (disambiguation)